Shishir Bhattacharja (born 4 August 1963) is a Bangladeshi linguist, writer, columnist, and a professor of the French language at the University of Dhaka. He is also the Director of the Institute of Modern Languages, University of Dhaka. An ardent advocate and promoter of the Bengali language, he has written extensively on the use of Bengali in Bangladesh. He translated works of Guillaume Apollinaire, Arthur Rimbaud, and Bernard-Henri Lévy into Bengali and poems of Jibanananda Das into French.

Education and career 
Born in Sitakunda, Chattogram, he completed Bachelor's and Master's in Indology and Linguistics at Université Sorbonne Nouvelle. He received his PhD from the University of Montreal, Canada. He did his post-doctorate at the Institute of State Language in University of Tokyo. In 1989, Bhattacharja joined Dhaka University where he is, at present, the Director of the Institute of Modern Languages.

Selected works

In Bengali 

Ishwar Dharma Bishwas (ঈশ্বর ধর্ম বিশ্বাস, God Religion Faith)
Samaj Sangskriti Shilpakala (সমাজ সংস্কৃতি শিল্পকলা, Society Culture Arts)
 Bangla Byakaraner Ruparekha (বাংলা ব্যাকরণের রূপরেখা, An Outline of Bengali Grammar)
 Bangla Bhasha: Prakrita Samasya o Peshadari Samadhan (বাংলা ভাষা: প্রকৃত সমস্যা ও পেশাদারি সমাধান, The Bengali Language: Problems and Solutions)
Ja Kichu Byakaran Nay (যা কিছু ব্যাকরণ নয়, Whatever is not Grammar)
 Antaranga Byakaran (অন্তরঙ্গ ব্যাকরণ, Intimate Grammar)
 Uchit Shiksha (উচিৎ শিক্ষা, Right Education)
 Bishwabidyalayer Itihas: Adiparba (বিশ্ববিদ্যালয়ের ইতিহাস: আদিপর্ব, History of University: The First Phase)
Jatrapala Chandragupta kingba Khamatasastrer Sohoj Path (যাত্রাপালা চন্দ্রগুপ্ত king-বা ক্ষমতা-শাস্ত্রের সহজপাঠ, Jatrapala Chandragupta or an Introduction to Power-politics)

Translations 

 Bangladesh Jakhan Swadhin Hacchila (বাংলাদেশ যখন স্বাধীন হচ্ছিল, When Bangladesh was getting liberated), a Bengali translation of Bernard-Henri Lévy's Bangla-Desh, Nationalisme dans la révolution (1973)
Rimbaud: Nirbachita Kabita ebang Patrabali (র‍্যাঁবো: নির্বাচিত কবিতা ও পত্রাবলি, Selected Poems and Letters of Rimbaud)
 Apollinaire: Nirbachita Kabita (আপোলিন্যার: নির্বাচিত কবিতা, Selected Poems of Apollinaire)

In English 
 Word Formation in Bengali: A Whole Word Morphological Description and its Theoretical Implications

In French 

Bhagwan et son monde orange (1991)
La poésie contemporaine du Bangladesh  (Co-author)

References 

Academic staff of the University of Dhaka
1963 births
Bangladeshi male writers
Bangladeshi columnists
Bangladeshi translators
Paris-Sorbonne University alumni
Université de Montréal alumni
Linguists from Bangladesh
Linguists of French
People from Chittagong District
Living people